No. 153 Squadron was a Royal Air Force squadron that saw service in both the First and Second World Wars.

History

On 1 July 1958, the unit was renumbered as No. 25 Squadron RAF.

Aircraft operated

Bases used
 RAF Ballyhalbert - October 1941 - January 1943
 RAF Limavady - October 1941 to January 1942 - Detachment
 RAF Maison Blanche - Algiers Algeria - December 1942 - July 1943
 RAF Rerhaia - Reghaia Algeria - July 1943 - September 1944
 RAF Alghero - Sardinia - July - September 1944 - Detachment
 RAF Kirmington - October 1944 - UK
 RAF Scampton - October 15,1944 to September, 1945

Notable personnel
 Kenneth Rayment, served with 153 Squadron from 1941 to 1943; he was the co-pilot during the Munich air disaster of 1958

References

Citations

Bibliography

External links

153